Kalunga is an Industrial Estate, which is situated at outskirts from the steel city Rourkela in Sundargarh district in Odisha state. It can be reached by both Road & Rail. Situated in the State Highway (SH-10), Rourkela to Sambalpur road.

Overview
Kalunga Industrial is mostly known for the sponge Iron & Chemical factories. It is main hub for the production of steel & chemicals for the  export in Odisha.

The city industrial hub of Kalunga, have residence of mainly industrial laborers who work in the factories. Kalunga is also known for the College of Rourkela Institute of Technology, which is situated in the center of its area.

Demographics
 India census, Kalunga had a population of 5296. Males constitute 53% of the population and females 47%. Kalunga has an average literacy rate of 30%, lower than the national average of 59.5%: male literacy is 48%, and female literacy is 21%. In Kalunga, 12% of the population is under 6 years of age.

Transport
Kalunga is a station on the Tatanagar Rourkela Bilaspur section of Howrah Nagpur Mumbai main line.
Through road it lies on the Sambalpur Rourkela Biju Express Way. This city is well connected to Rourkela, Sundargarh, Sambalpur and Ranchi through the local buses.

Education
Kalunga has a government High School located in the main center of the hub. Still the industrial estate has got St. Gregorious Higher Secondary School, one of the best English medium school in the district which is affiliated to ICSE up to standard XII.

Another Important Diploma College include Rourkela Institute of Technology, which was established in the year of 1984, in the private industrial estate of Kalunga.

Factories
Factories Include:
SAV Industries Pvt. Ltd
Nixon Steel & Power
IFGL Refractories Limited
Hindustan Aqua
Poly Refractories Pvt. Ltd
Utkal Metallic Ltd.
Pooja Sponge Pvt. Ltd.
Kalinga Sponge Iron Ltd.
Kedia Carbon Pvt. Ltd.
Santa Chemicals Pvt. Ltd.
Shivani Metal's & Minerals
Shiela Engineering Works
Irshant Innovations Pvt. Ltd.
Cera Engineering Pvt. Ltd.
Mahalaxmi Furnace
Spardha Steel Pvt. Ltd.
Rifulgent Ispat Pvt. Ltd.
Process Additives & Chemical's Pvt. Ltd.
Bajrangbali RE Rollers Pvt. Ltd.
Golchha Pigments Pvt. Ltd.
Chariot Cement Company
Maa Visnovi Sponge Ltd
Meta Sponge (P) Ltd.
Sponge Udyog Pvt. Ltd.
Seeta Sponge Iron Ltd.,
Maa Tarini Industries (P) Ltd.
Sponge Udyog Pvt. Ltd.
Sri Mahavir Ferro Alloys (P) Ltd.
AKS Electrical's Pvt Ltd .
Gajalakshmi Iron Works.
Applied Communication & Controls
Raj Engineers
SLM TECHNOLOGY(P) LTD.

Tourism
Kalunga is known for its beautiful rain water Harvesting Dam of Pitamahal Dam which is located 10 km inside the Industrial estate.

References

External links
 Kalunga in Google Map

Sundergarh district
Economy of Odisha
Industrial parks in India

To know about Kalunga:-

https://www.facebook.com/kalungatips/